Globularia trichosantha is an ornamental plant in the family Plantaginaceae. It is a mat-forming evergreen with oval leaves that blooms from early spring and through the summer carrying pale blue flowers that brighten in the summer.

References

External links
Globularia
Globularia trichosantha

trichosantha
Flora of Europe